Rapale is a village located in south-western Arezzo within the municipality of Bucine in Tuscany, Italy.

Geography
Rapale is located near the province of Siena in Tuscany, Italy. The village is part of the municipality of Bucine in south-western Arezzo.

The Pratomagno is a mountain range which has the Arno river on both sides: to the west is the upper Valdarno and to the east is the Casentino. It lies north-west of the city of Arezzo, in Tuscany, Italy.

Grain, tobacco, and Chianti grapes are harvested during the autumn harvest.

Festivals and Celebrations

Calici di Stelle

Calici di Stelle, known as Chalices of Stars is a yearly celebration of the nightly sky above Rapale and its telescopic observation. Calici di Stelle is a traditional summer event created by Movimento Turismo del Vino that, singing the praises of Bacchus, one of the most fascinating nights of the year, offers tourists the chance to enjoy "the rain of tears of St. Lawrence" in the company of a quality wine.

On August 10 of each year, in city centers and in the Italian squares, including courts of unexpected beauty and castles, lovers of good drinking wine lovers can taste the best wines from member wineries combined with typical quality products, an expression of local heritage each region hosting the event.

Shooting stars reinforcing the unique combination of wine and art, offering close to tasting masterfully guided by skilled sommeliers and renowned Italian wine maker, a rich set of initiatives that will cheer nicely with jazz and classical music concerts, historical parades, theatrical performances and games Pirici, the many Italian and foreign tourists who choose a new concept of summer vacation to discover the art city.

References

External links
 Official website

Frazioni of the Province of Arezzo